Dingan or Ding'an may refer to:

Dingane kaSenzangakhona (1795–1840), Zulu chief who became king in 1828
Jeongan (定安國; 938–986), a historical state in Manchuria
Ding'an County (定安县), Hainan, China
Ding'an dialect of Hainanese
Princess Ding'an (定安公主), or Princess Taihe, princess of the Tang dynasty of China
Ding'an, Tianlin County (定安镇), town in Guangxi, China